Muriel Brunner Castanis (1926 – 2006) was an American sculptor best known for her public art installments involving fluidly draped figures.

Biography 
Born as Muriel Brunner on September 27, 1926 in New York City, the youngest of six children. She was raised in Greenwich Village and attended New York's High School of Music and Art. Castanis did not begin her art career until 1964 at the age of 38, she was self-taught.

Her image is included in the iconic 1972 poster  Some Living American Women Artists by Mary Beth Edelson.

Her 1980 exhibit at the OK Harris Works of Art in Manhattan led to her career breakthrough. Her work Corporate Goddesses (1982), features twelve fiberglass statues of faceless women standing 12 feet tall atop 580 California Street building, designed by architect Philip Johnson, have stirred varying interpretations, as viewers try to understand the symbolism.

She died on 22 November 2006 at age 80 from lung failure in Greenwich Village neighborhood in New York City, and was survived by her husband George Castanis and their four children.

Works

References

External links
580 California Street Sculpture, San Francisco
Oral history interview with Muriel Castanis, 1971, Archives of American Art, Smithsonian Institution

1926 births
2006 deaths
Artists from New York City
Deaths from respiratory failure
People from Greenwich Village
20th-century American sculptors
American women sculptors
20th-century American women artists
The High School of Music & Art alumni
Sculptors from New York (state)
21st-century American women